Oribacterium sinus is an anaerobic bacterium from the genus of Oribacterium which has been isolated from the maxillary sinus of a human in Nancy in France.

References 

Lachnospiraceae
Bacteria described in 2004